The 2021–22 Cal State Northridge Matadors men's basketball team represented California State University, Northridge in the 2021–22 NCAA Division I men's basketball season. The Matadors, led by interim head coach Trent Johnson, played their home games at the Matadome in Northridge, California as members of the Big West Conference.

Previous season
In a season limited due to the ongoing COVID-19 pandemic, the Matadors finished the 2020–21 season 9–13, 5–9 in Big West play to finish in eighth place. They lost to Long Beach State in the first round of the Big West tournament.

Roster

Schedule and results 

|-
!colspan=12 style=| Non-conference regular season

|-
!colspan=9 style=| Big West regular season

|-
!colspan=12 style=| Big West tournament

|-

Source

References

Cal State Northridge Matadors men's basketball seasons
Cal State Northridge Matadors
Cal State Northridge Matadors men's basketball
Cal State Northridge Matadors men's basketball